Andrew Aitken Rooney (January 14, 1919 – November 4, 2011) was an American radio and television writer who was best known for his weekly broadcast "A Few Minutes with Andy Rooney", a part of the CBS News program 60 Minutes from 1978 to 2011. His final regular appearance on 60 Minutes aired on October 2, 2011; he died a month later at the age of 92.

Early life and education
Andrew Aitken Rooney was born in Albany, New York, the son of Walter Scott Rooney (1888–1959) and Ellinor (Reynolds) Rooney (1886–1980). He attended The Albany Academy, and later attended Colgate University in Hamilton in central New York, where he was initiated into the Sigma Chi fraternity, before he was drafted into the United States Army in August 1941.

World War II 
Rooney began his career in newspapers in 1942 while in the Army where he began writing for Stars and Stripes in London. He was one of six correspondents who flew on the second American bombing raid over Germany in February 1943, flying with the Eighth Air Force. He was the first journalist to reach the Ludendorff Bridge after the 9th Armored Division captured it on March 7, 1945. "It was a reporter's dream," he wrote. "One of the great stories of the war had fallen into my lap." The bridge capture was front-page news in America. Rooney rated the capture of the bridge as one of the top five events of the entire European war, alongside D-Day.

He was one of the first American journalists to visit the Nazi concentration camps near the end of World War II, and one of the first to write about them. During a segment on Tom Brokaw's The Greatest Generation, Rooney stated that he had been opposed to World War II because he was a pacifist. He recounted that what he saw in those concentration camps made him ashamed that he had opposed the war and permanently changed his opinions about whether "just wars" exist.

Rooney was decorated with the Bronze Star Medal and Air Medal for his service as a war correspondent in combat zones during the war. His 1995 memoir My War chronicles his war reporting and recounts several notable historical events and people from a first-hand view, including the entry into Paris and the Nazi concentration camps. He describes how it shaped his experience both as a writer and reporter.

Career
Rooney joined CBS in 1949 as a writer for Arthur Godfrey's Talent Scouts, when Godfrey was at his peak on CBS radio and TV. It opened the show up to a variety of viewers. The program was a hit, reaching number one in 1952 during Rooney's tenure. It was the beginning of a close lifelong friendship between Rooney and Godfrey. He wrote for Godfrey's daytime radio and TV show Arthur Godfrey Time. He later moved on to The Garry Moore Show which became a hit program. During the same period, he wrote public affairs programs for CBS News, such as The Twentieth Century.

Rooney wrote his first television essay in 1964 called "An Essay on Doors", "a longer-length precursor of the type" that he did on 60 Minutes, according to CBS News's biography of him. From 1962 to 1968, he collaborated with CBS News correspondent Harry Reasoner, Rooney writing and producing and Reasoner narrating. They wrote on CBS News specials such as "An Essay on Bridges" (1965), "An Essay on Hotels" (1966), "An Essay on Women" (1967), and "The Strange Case of the English Language" (1968).  In 1968, he wrote two episodes of the CBS News documentary series Of Black America, and his script for "Black History: Lost, Stolen, or Strayed" won him his first Emmy.

CBS refused to broadcast his World War II memoir titled "An Essay on War" in 1970, so Rooney quit CBS and read the opinion himself on PBS, which was his first appearance on television. That show in 1971 won him his third Writers Guild Award. He rejoined CBS in 1973 to write and produce special programs. He also wrote the script for the 1975 documentary FDR: The Man Who Changed America.

After his return to the network, Rooney wrote and appeared in several primetime specials for CBS, including In Praise of New York City (1974), the Peabody Award-winning Mr. Rooney Goes to Washington (1975), Mr. Rooney Goes to Dinner (1978), and Mr. Rooney Goes to Work (1977). Transcripts of these specials are contained in the book A Few Minutes with Andy Rooney, as well as of some of the earlier collaborations with Reasoner.

"A Few Minutes with Andy Rooney"
Rooney's "end-of-show" segment on 60 Minutes, "A Few Minutes with Andy Rooney" (originally "Three Minutes or So With Andy Rooney"), began in 1978, as a summer replacement for the debate segment "Point/Counterpoint" featuring Shana Alexander and James Kilpatrick. The segment proved popular enough with viewers that beginning in the fall of 1978, it was seen in alternate weeks with the debate segment. At the end of the 1978–1979 season, "Point/Counterpoint" was dropped altogether.

In the segment, Rooney typically offered satire on a trivial everyday issue, such as the cost of groceries, annoying relatives, or faulty Christmas presents. Rooney's appearances on "A Few Minutes with Andy Rooney" often included whimsical lists, such as types of milk, bottled water brands, car brands, and sports mascots.  In later years, his segments became more political as well. Despite being best known for his television presence on 60 Minutes, Rooney always considered himself a writer who incidentally appeared on television behind his famous walnut table, which he had made himself.

Controversies
Rooney made a number of comments which elicited strong reactions from fans and producers alike.

Comments on race
In February 1990, CBS's 60 Minutes suspended Rooney for three months after it was alleged that he had suggested that black people were less intelligent because they "watered down their genes". After the program's ratings dropped significantly, Rooney was let back on in March. Rooney vehemently disputed this in a 1999 interview, claiming he was instead referring to lower-income people more broadly.

Rooney wrote a column in 1992 that posited that it was "silly" for Native Americans to complain about team names like the Redskins, in which he wrote in part, "The real problem is, we took the country away from the Indians, they want it back and we're not going to give it to them. We feel guilty and we'll do what we can for them within reason, but they can't have their country back. Next question." After receiving many letters from Native Americans he wrote, "when so many people complain about one thing, you have to assume you may have been wrong".

In a 2007 column for Tribune media services, he wrote, "I know all about Babe Ruth and Lou Gehrig, but today's baseball stars are all guys named Rodriguez to me." Rooney later commented, "Yeah, I probably shouldn't have said it, [but] it's a name that seems common in baseball now. I certainly didn't think of it in any derogatory sense."

In the 1940s, Rooney was arrested after sitting in the back of a racially segregated bus in protest against such segregation. Also, in 2008, when Barack Obama was elected president of the United States, Rooney applauded the fact that "the citizens of this country, 80% of whom are white, freely chose to elect a black man as their leader simply because they thought he was the best choice." He said that it made him proud, and that it proved that the country had "come a long way—a good way."

Comments on same-sex unions
In 1990, Rooney was suspended without pay for three months by then-CBS News President David Burke, because of the negative publicity around his saying that "too much alcohol, too much food, drugs, homosexual unions, cigarettes [are] all known to lead to premature death." He wrote an explanatory letter to a gay organization after being ordered not to do so. After only four weeks without Rooney, 60 Minutes lost 20% of its audience. CBS management then decided that it was in the best interest of the network to have Rooney return immediately.

After Rooney's reinstatement, he made his remorse public:

Remarks on Kurt Cobain's suicide
In a 1994 segment, Rooney attracted controversy with his remarks on Kurt Cobain's suicide. He expressed his dismay that the death of Richard Nixon was overshadowed by Cobain's suicide, stating that he had never heard of Cobain or his band, Nirvana. He went on to say that Cobain's suicide made him angry. "A lot of people would like to have the years left that he threw away," Rooney said. "What's all this nonsense about how terrible life is?" he asked, adding rhetorically to a young woman who had wept at the suicide, "I'd love to relieve the pain you're going through by switching my age for yours." In addition, he asked "What would all these young people be doing if they had real problems like a Depression, World War II, or Vietnam?" and commented, "If [Cobain] applied the same brain to his music that he applied to his drug-infested life, it's reasonable to think that his music may not have made much sense, either."

On the following Sunday's show, he apologized on the air, saying he should have taken Cobain's depression into account. He also read only critical feedback from listeners without interjecting any commentary of his own.

Collections and retirement
Rooney's shorter television essays have been archived in numerous books, such as Common Nonsense, which came out in 2002, and Years of Minutes, probably his best-known work, released in 2003. He penned a regular syndicated column for Tribune Media Services that ran in many newspapers in the United States, and which has been collected in book form. He won three Emmy Awards for his essays, which numbered over 1,000. He was awarded a Lifetime Achievement Emmy in 2003. Rooney's renown made him a frequent target of parodies and impersonations by a diverse group of comic figures, including Frank Caliendo, Rich Little and Beavis.

In 1993, CBS released a two-volume VHS tape set of the best of Rooney's commentaries and field reports, called "The Andy Rooney Television Collection — His Best Minutes." In 2006, CBS released three DVDs of his more recent commentaries, Andy Rooney On Almost Everything, Things That Bother Andy Rooney, and Andy Rooney's Solutions.

Rooney's final regular appearance on 60 Minutes was on October 2, 2011, after 33 years on the show. It was his 1,097th commentary.

Views
He claimed on Larry King Live to have a liberal bias, stating, "There is just no question that I, among others, have a liberal bias. I mean, I'm consistently liberal in my opinions." In a controversial 1999 book, Rooney self-identified as agnostic, but by 2004 he was calling himself an atheist. He reaffirmed this in 2008. Over the years, many of his editorials poked fun at the concept of God and organized religion. Increased speculation on this was brought to a head by a series of comments he made regarding Mel Gibson's film The Passion of the Christ (2004).

Though Rooney has been called Irish-American, he once said "I'm proud of my Irish heritage, but I'm not Irish. I'm not even Irish-American. I am American, period."

In 2005, when four people were fired at CBS News perhaps because of the Killian documents controversy, Rooney said, "The people on the front lines got fired while the people most instrumental in getting the broadcast on escaped." Others at CBS had "kept mum" about the controversy.

Personal life
Rooney was married to Marguerite "Margie" Rooney (née Howard) for 62 years, until she died of heart failure in 2004. He later wrote, "her name does not appear as often as it originally did [in my essays] because it hurts too much to write it." They had four children: Ellen, Emily, Martha, and Brian. His daughter Emily Rooney is a TV talk show host and former ABC News producer who went on to host a nightly Boston-area public affairs program, Greater Boston, on WGBH. Emily's identical twin, Martha Fishel, became chief of the Public Services Division at the National Library of Medicine in Bethesda, Maryland;  her son Justin works as a producer for ABC News. His first daughter, Ellen Rooney, is a former film editor at ABC News and is now a travel and garden photographer based in London. His son, Brian Rooney, has been a correspondent for ABC since the 1980s and lives in Los Angeles.

Rooney also had a sister, Nancy Reynolds Rooney (1915–2007).

Rooney lived in the Rowayton section of Norwalk, Connecticut, and in Rensselaerville, New York, and was a longtime season ticket holder for the New York Giants.

Death
Rooney was hospitalized on October 25, 2011, after developing postoperative complications from an undisclosed surgical procedure, and died on November 4, 2011, at the age of 92, less than five weeks after his last appearance on 60 Minutes.

Awards
 2001 – Emperor Has No Clothes Award from the Freedom From Religion Foundation.
 2003 – Walter Cronkite Award for Excellence in Journalism.

Books
Books written by Rooney:
 Conquerors' Peace; report to the American stockholders, by Oram C. Hutton and Andrew A. Rooney. Garden City, N.Y.: Doubleday, 1947.
 A Few Minutes With Andy Rooney, 1981
 And More by Andy Rooney, 1982
 Pieces of My Mind, 1984
 The Most of Andy Rooney, 1986
 Word for Word, 1988
 Not That You Asked ..., 1989
 Most of Andy Rooney, 1990
 Sweet and Sour, 1992
 My War, 1995
 Sincerely, Andy Rooney, 1999
 The Complete Andy Rooney, 2000
 Common Nonsense, 2002,
 Years of Minutes, 2003
 Out of My Mind, 2006
 60 Years of Wisdom and Wit, 2009

See also

 Rooney (surname)

References

External links

 
 
 
 
 

1919 births
2011 deaths
American humorists
American broadcast news analysts
American television journalists
American war correspondents of World War II
American commentators
American male journalists
CBS News people
60 Minutes correspondents
American memoirists
Recipients of the Air Medal
United States Army personnel of World War II
United States Army soldiers
Writers from Norwalk, Connecticut
American atheists
Colgate University alumni
Writers from Albany, New York
People from Rensselaerville, New York
20th-century American journalists
21st-century American journalists
Journalists from New York (state)
The Albany Academy alumni